Neil Norman is a British playwright and critic. A journalist on the New Musical Express in the early 1970s, Norman became a film critic for The Face and in the ensuing years a reviewer of film and theatre for various cinema magazines and national newspapers. He joined the Evening Standard in 1986 as a film critic and feature writer. He appeared regularly as a contributor to the Sky Arts series Discovering & The Directors. He is co-author of a book about the 1985  film Insignificance and the Robbie Coltrane biography Looking For Robbie. His plays have been performed in London, Toronto and New York.

References

External links

Living people
British dramatists and playwrights
British theatre critics
British male dramatists and playwrights
Year of birth missing (living people)